Jeongol (전골) is a Korean-style hot pot made by putting meat, mushroom, seafood, seasoning, etc., in a stew pot, adding broth, and boiling it. It is similar to the category of Korean stews called jjigae,  with the main difference being that jjigae are generally made with only a single main ingredient, and named after that ingredient (such as kimchi jjigae or sundubu jjigae), while jeongol usually contain a variety of main ingredients. An additional difference is that jeongol (like gujeolpan) was originally a dish for upper-class Koreans and members of the royal court, while jjigae was a simpler dish for commoners.

History
According to the late Joseon era book Manguksamulkiwon Yeoksa (hangul: 만국사물기원역사, hanja: 萬國事物紀原歷史, "The History of Various Objects from all over the World"), jeongol originated from ancient times when soldiers would cook their food in iron helmets during times of war for lack of cooking utensils. In other Joseon era documents such as Kyeongdo Jabji (hangul: 경도잡지, hanja: 京都雜志), it is mentioned that jeongol was cooked in a vessel called jeolliptu (전립투, soldier's hat) because it resembled a soldier's helmet. In Siuijeonseo (hangul: 시의전서, hanja: 是議全書), it is mentioned that thinly sliced seasoned beef was cooked in a pot and sprinkled with pine nut powder, and occasionally cooked with bamboo shoots, baby octopus and oysters.

Preparation
Jeongol usually contains sliced beef or seafood, vegetables, mushrooms, and other seasonings, which are boiled with a small amount of broth in a jeongolteul (전골틀, pot used for cooking jeongol). They may also include mandu (dumplings). Some jeongol are spicy, containing added gochujang or chili pepper powder, although these ingredients may be omitted. The variety of broth used varies according to the type of jeongol being prepared.

Varieties
Bosin jeongol (보신전골) - made with dog meat
Sinseollo (신선로) - a variety of jeongol formerly served in Korean royal court cuisine
Haemul jeongol (해물전골) - made with seafood
Nakji jeongol (낙지전골) - made with small octopus
Sogogi jeongol (소고기전골) - made with beef but no seafood
Mandu jeongol (만두전골) - made with mandu
Dubu jeongol (두부전골) - made with tofu
Beoseot jeongol (버섯전골) - made with mushrooms
Gopchang jeongol (곱창전골) - made with beef offal
Gaksaek jeongol, (각색전골) - made with various ingredients.

See also

 Jjigae, another category of stew from Korea
 Hot pot
 Nabemono, a similar variety of dishes from Japan
 Oden
 Pot-au-feu
 Sinseollo
 Thai suki
 Korean royal court cuisine
 List of casserole dishes
 List of Korean dishes
 List of soups

References

External links
 

Korean soups and stews
Table-cooked dishes